Out Of A Dream is a 1997 (see 1997 in music) album by Ilse Huizinga.

Track listing
 "The Old Country" (Reginald Lewis, Nat Adderley)  – 6:35
 "Up Jumped Springtime" (Freddie Hubbard, Abbey Lincoln)  – 4:02
 "You Stepped Out of a Dream" (Nacio Herb Brown, Gus Kahn) – 4:44
 "My Heart Stood Still" (Richard Rodgers, Lorenz Hart) – 5:39
 "I Hear Music" (Burton Lane, Frank Loesser) – 3:40
 "I Got Lost In His Arms" (Irving Berlin) – 6:01
 "I Didn't Know What Time It Was" (Rodgers, Hart)  – 2:41
 "Yesterdays" (Otto Harbach, Jerome Kern)  – 3:58
 "A Time For Love" (Johnny Mandel, Paul Francis Webster)  – 4:14

Personnel
Recorded at Studio 44, Monster, Netherlands.

 Ilse Huizinga - vocals
 Erik van der Luijt - grand piano, arranger
 Sven Schuster - double bass
 Steve Altenberg - drums, percussion
 Simon Rigter - tenor saxophone
 Jan van Duikeren - trumpet

References

Ilse Huizinga albums
1997 albums